Ivo Willem Opstelten (born 31 January 1944) is a retired Dutch politician and jurist. He is a member of the People's Party for Freedom and Democracy (VVD).

Opstelten applied at Leiden University in May 1963 majoring in Law and obtaining a Bachelor of Laws degree in June 1965 before graduating with a Master of Laws degree in July 1969. Opstelten worked as a civil servant for the municipality of Vlaardingen from January 1970 until Augustus 1972. In Augustus 1972 Opstelten was nominated as Mayor of Dalen, taking office on 26 August 1972. In September 1977 Opstelten was nominated as Mayor of Doorn, he resigned as Mayor of Dalen the same day he was installed as Mayor of Doorn, taking office on 1 October 1977. In November 1980 Opstelten was nominated as Mayor of Delfzijl, he resigned as Mayor of Doorn the same day he was installed as Mayor of Delfzijl, taking office on 1 December 1980. Opstelten served as acting Mayor of Beerta from 1 December 1983 until 1 March 1984 during a parental leave of Hanneke Jagersma. In August 1987 Opstelten was appointment as Director-General of the department for Public Safety and Security of the Ministry of the Interior, he resigned as Mayor of Delfzijl of the same day he was installed as Director-General on 1 September 1987. In October 1992 Opstelten was nominated as Mayor of Utrecht, he resigned as Director-General the same day he was installed as Mayor of Utrecht, taking office on 1 November 1992. In January 1999 Opstelten was nominated as Mayor of Rotterdam, he resigned as Mayor of Utrecht the same day he was installed as Mayor of Rotterdam, serving from 16 February 1999 until 1 January 2009. Opstelten served as Chairmen of the People's Party for Freedom and Democracy from 23 May 2008 until 14 October 2010. Opstelten served as acting Mayor of Tilburg from 4 November 2009 until 16 July 2010 following the resignation of Ruud Vreeman.

After the election of 2010 Opstelten was appointed as Informateur for the cabinet formation of 2010. Following the cabinet formation Opstelten was appointed as Minister of Security and Justice in the Cabinet Rutte I, taking office on 14 October 2010. The Cabinet Rutte I fell on 23 April 2012 after the Party for Freedom (PVV) withdrew their confidence and supply and continued to serve in a demissionary capacity. In May 2012 Opstelten announced that he wouldn't stand for the election of 2012. Following the cabinet formation of 2012 Opstelten continued as Minister of Security and Justice in the Cabinet Rutte II, taking office on 5 November 2012. On 10 March 2015 Opstelten and State Secretary for Security and Justice Fred Teeven resigned after he had misinformed the House of Representatives about the  that was mishandled by Teeven during the time he had served as a prosecutor. Opstelten retired after spending 42 years in national politics and became active in the public sector and occupied numerous seats as a corporate director and nonprofit director on several boards of directors and supervisory boards.

Biography

Early life
Opstelten studied law at Leiden University, where he specialised in constitutional and public law. He graduated in 1969 and worked from 1970 to 1972 at the municipality of Vlaardingen before starting a long-term career as mayor.

Politics
In 1972 Opstelten began as Mayor of Dalen, at the age of 28 the youngest Mayor of the Netherlands. In 1977 he became Mayor of Doorn. In 1980 he became the Mayor of Delfzijl. In 1983 he became Acting Mayor of Beerta for four months because of the pregnancy of Mayor Hanneke Jagersma. In 1992 he made the switch to the fourth largest Municipality of the Netherlands, Utrecht. In 1999 he was nominated as Mayor of Rotterdam, the second biggest city of the Netherlands. In 2002 he was praised for his handling of the aftermath of the assassination of politician Pim Fortuyn. He served as Mayor of Rotterdam for ten years. He resigned on 1 January 2009. He was succeeded by Ahmed Aboutaleb. On 31 March 2008 he was elected as the new Party chair of the People's Party for Freedom and Democracy. On 6 November 2009 it was announced by Wim van de Donk, the Queen's Commissioner of North Brabant, that Opstelten had accepted the position as Acting Mayor of Tilburg after Mayor Ruud Vreeman's resignation was sought by the City council of Tilburg.

On 4 August 2010 Queen Beatrix nominated Opstelten as fifth informateur in the 2010 Dutch cabinet formation. On September 4, the Queen replaced Opstelten with Herman Tjeenk Willink, the Vice President of the Council of State as the new informateur. On 13 September 2010 he became informateur a second time and on September 28 the negotiations were finished. A coalition agreement was reached between People's Party for Freedom and Democracy and Christian Democratic Appeal to form a minority coalition, supported by the Party for Freedom to obtain a majority. Formateur Mark Rutte asked Opstelten as the Minister of Security and Justice in the new cabinet. Because a Party chair can not serve in the cabinet, he resigned as a Party chair of the People's Party for Freedom and Democracy on 14 October 2010, the day he took office as the new Minister of Security and Justice.

During his tenure as Minister of Security and Justice, Opstelten was the driving force behind the closure of the majority of The Netherlands' coffeeshops and growshops effectively ending the successful 1970's instituted experiment where soft drugs were tolerated and separated from the hard drugs market. Affiliated with the Christian Democratic Appeal (CDA) party, Opstelten also imposed many restrictions on the legal and regulated prostitution business in the Netherlands also driving a portion of that business underground.

In the week after his resignation from office, he was interviewed about the increased use of heavy firearms by criminals. He said that maybe in the past firearms didn't have the attention of the authorities, but now they rose to the challenge and he was on it. In reality he had quietly disbanded the task force on heavy weapons two months earlier.

Resignation from office
On 10 March 2015 Opstelten, along with State Secretary Fred Teeven resigned after it was discovered that Teeven, then chief public prosecutor authorized the return of 4.7 million guilders to convicted drugs dealer Cees H. in 2000, without the knowledge of his superior or the tax office.

Throughout 2014, questions had been asked about this drugs deal. Opstelten consistently told parliament that the deal was for 2 million guilders and that they should trust him on that. On March 4, news show Nieuwsuur uncovered evidence that it was actually 4.7 million guilders. Cees H. confirmed this and stated that he did not do the justice department any favor in return, such as testifying. During a press conference on March 9, Opstelten admitted that convicted drugs baron Cees H. had been paid 4.7 million guilders, not the two million guilders he had consistently told parliament. The next day he resigned. Other politicians were disappointed that he left many questions unanswered by resigning, such as how he could not know the amount despite the deal being orchestrated by his own deputy minister and why the tax service was not involved in the deal.

Preceding the affair which resulted in his resignation, Opstelten was already often accused of not knowing the facts during debates and having difficulty finding words in other cases.

Personal
Ivo Opstelten is married to Mariette Dutilh (born 1945) and they have four children.

Decorations

References

External links

Official
  Mr. I.W. (Ivo) Opstelten Parlement & Politiek

1944 births
Living people
Chairmen of the People's Party for Freedom and Democracy
Dutch nonprofit directors
Dutch television presenters
Leiden University alumni
Mayors in Groningen (province)
Mayors in Drenthe
Mayors in Utrecht (province)
People from Doorn
People from Delfzijl
Mayors of Rotterdam
Mayors in North Brabant
People from Tilburg
Mayors of Utrecht
Ministers of Justice of the Netherlands
Officers of the Order of Orange-Nassau
Vice Chairmen of the People's Party for Freedom and Democracy
People's Party for Freedom and Democracy politicians
Remonstrants
20th-century Dutch civil servants
20th-century Dutch jurists
20th-century Dutch politicians
21st-century Dutch civil servants
21st-century Dutch jurists
21st-century Dutch politicians